Jeera rice or jeera bhaat is an Indian dish consisting of rice and cumin seeds. It is a very popular dish in the Indian subcontinent and most commonly used as an everyday rice dish. The Hindi term for cumin seeds is "jeera", thus owing to the name of the dish. The ingredients used are rice, cumin seeds, vegetable oil, onions, salt and coriander leaves.

Etymology 
The name Jeera Bhaat is a compound of two Hindi words: Jeera and Bhaat. The word Jeera (or Jīrā in IAST) is derived from the Sanskrit word Jīraka, which means cumin seeds. The word Bhaat is derived from the Sanskrit word Bhakta meaning "boiled rice".

Preparation
Cumin seeds are fried in hot oil. Long-grain Basmati rice and salt are added to it. Water is then poured and allowed to boil with covered lid at high flame. The rice then is steamed on low flame until all the water is absorbed.

Jeera rice is generally garnished with finely chopped fresh coriander leaves but is also garnished with onion rings in some Indian hotels and restaurants.

References

External links

 Jeera Rice Recipe
 Jeera Rice Recipe Video

Indian rice dishes
North Indian cuisine
Pakistani rice dishes